Franz Eisenach (11 August 1918 – 21 August 1998) was a German fighter ace during World War II and a recipient of the Knight's Cross of the Iron Cross of Nazi Germany. He was credited with 129 aerial victories claimed in 319 combat missions, all on the Eastern front of the Second World War.

Career
In March 1942, IV. Gruppe of Jagdgeschwader 1 (JG 1–1st Fighter Wing) was re-designated and became the III. Gruppe of Jagdgeschwader 5 (JG 5—5th Fighter Wing). In consequence, Hauptmann Fritz Losigkeit was charged with the creation of a new IV. Gruppe which was initially based at Werneuchen near Berlin. Oberleutnant Friedrich Eberle headed 10. Staffel which had already served as 3. Staffel of Jagdgruppe Losigkeit. The Einsatzstaffel of Jagdfliegerschule 4 under Oberleutnant Wilhelm Moritz formed 11. Staffel on 3 April. Eisenach initially led 12. Staffel created from some pilots of the former IV. Gruppe. Command of 12. Staffel then passed on to Oberleutnant Heinz Stöcker in October.

Eisenach was appointed Staffelkapitän (squadron leader) of 3. Staffel (3rd squadron) of Jagdgeschwader 54 (JG 54—54th Fighter Wing) on 17 April 1943. He replaced Hauptmann Gerhard Koall in this function who was transferred. On 8 July 1943, Eisenach was wounded in his Focke Wulf Fw 190 A-5 (Werknummer 1503—factory number) during combat with Douglas A-20 Havoc bombers northeast of Panino. During his convalescence, he was temporarily replaced by Oberleutnant Robert Weiß as Staffelkapitän. On 18 December, he was again injured and shot down.

On 8 August 1944, Eisennach was appointed Gruppenkommandeur (group commander) on I. Gruppe of JG 54. He succeeded Hauptmann Horst Ademeit who was killed in action the day before.

Soviet forces launched the Baltic Offensive on 14 September 1944. Thad day, Eisenach claimed his 100th victory on 14 September 1944 by shooting down an IL-2 Sturmovik. That day, he became an "ace-in-a-day" claiming nine aerial victories, include five Ilyushin Il-2 ground attach aircraft and four Petlyakov Pe-2 twin-engined dive bombers. He was the 90th Luftwaffe pilot to achieve the century mark. Eisenach was awarded the Knight's Cross of the Iron Cross on 10 October for 107 aerial victories.

Eisenach re-joined the military service of the Bundeswehr in 1956. He left the service in 1974 with the rank of Oberstleutnant (lieutenant colonel).

Summary of career

Aerial victory claims
According to US historian David T. Zabecki, Eisenach was credited with 129 aerial victories. Spick also lists Eisenach with 129 aerial victories claimed in 319 combat missions, all of which on the Eastern Front. Mathews and Foreman, authors of Luftwaffe Aces — Biographies and Victory Claims, researched the German Federal Archives and also found confirmed records for 129 aerial victories for 154 claims filed.

Victory claims were logged to a map-reference (PQ = Planquadrat), for example "PQ 00253". These sectors were then subdivided into 36 smaller units to give a location area 3 × 4 km in size.

Awards
 Honour Goblet of the Luftwaffe on 13 September 1943 as Oberleutnant and pilot
 German Cross in Gold on 16 January 1944 as Oberleutnant in the I./Jagdgeschwader 54
 Knight's Cross of the Iron Cross on 10 October 1944 as Hauptmann and Staffelkapitän of the 3./Jagdgeschwader 54

Notes

References

Citations

Bibliography

 
 
 
 
 
 
 
 
 
 
 
 
 
 
 

1918 births
1998 deaths
Luftwaffe pilots
People from Choszczno County
German World War II flying aces
People from the Province of Brandenburg
Recipients of the Gold German Cross
Recipients of the Knight's Cross of the Iron Cross